Walker Lake is an alpine lake in Custer County, Idaho, United States, located in the White Cloud Mountains in the Sawtooth National Recreation Area.  The lake is accessed from Sawtooth National Forest trail 601.

Walker Lake is east of D. O. Lee Peak and downstream of several other lakes including:
Boulder Lake
Cirque Lake
Cove Lake
Gentian Lake
Hook Lake
Neck Lake
Sapphire Lake
Sheep Lake
Slide Lake
Snow Lake

References

See also
 List of lakes of the White Cloud Mountains
 Sawtooth National Recreation Area
 White Cloud Mountains

Lakes of Idaho
Lakes of Custer County, Idaho
Glacial lakes of the United States
Glacial lakes of the Sawtooth National Forest